Coelostomatini is a tribe of water scavenger beetles in the family Hydrophilidae. There are about 7 genera and more than 70 described species in Coelostomatini.

Genera
These seven genera belong to the tribe Coelostomatini:
 Coelofletium Orchymont, 1925
 Coelostoma Brullé, 1835
 Cyclotypus Sharp, 1882
 Dactylosternum Wollaston, 1854
 Pelosoma Mulsant, 1844
 Phaenonotum Sharp, 1882
 Phaenostoma Orchymont, 1937

References

Further reading

External links

 

Hydrophilidae
Articles created by Qbugbot
Beetle tribes